{{DISPLAYTITLE:C14H17N3O}}
The molecular formula C14H17N3O (molar mass: 243.30 g/mol, exact mass: 243.1372 u) may refer to:

 Frovatriptan
 YM-348

Molecular formulas